Coppergate is a street in the city centre of York, in England. The street runs north-east from the junction of Castlegate, Nessgate, King Street and Clifford Street, to end at the junction of Pavement, Piccadilly, Parliament Street and High Ousegate.

History
The site of the street lays outside  Roman York's walls and was a glass-making district. It was abandoned after the Roman period and re-occupied during the 9th-century, Viking York. During the 11th-century, housing existed on the street, found through archaeological finding.

Some time between 1120 and 1135, it was first recorded as a centre for coopers, from which its name derives. Over time, the Pavement Market spread onto the street. The south-western end of the street was widened in 1900, leading to the replacement of most Mediaeval buildings. 

In 1976, major Viking remains were found immediately south of the street, while a cinema and the Cravens confectionery factory were demolished. Coppergate Shopping Centre opened in 1984, over the demolished buildings.

Architecture

The back of the church of All Saints, Pavement, lies on the north side of the street, followed by a row of shops with their main entrances on High Ousegate.  Numbers 3–7 was built in two stages in the 1900s, and late-20th century was occupied by Habitat.  On the south side, Galtres Chambers and the 16th-century Three Tuns pub are both listed buildings, as are two structures with 15th-century origins: 26 Coppergate, and 28–32 Coppergate.

References

 
Streets in York